Christians account for 19.7 percent of the total population of the United Arab Emirates, according to a ministry report, which collected census data.

The government recognises various Christian denominations. Christians are free to worship and wear religious clothing, if applicable. The country has Catholic, Eastern and Oriental Orthodox along with Protestant churches. Although Christian women can marry Muslim men freely, marriage between Muslim women and non-Muslim men is forbidden.

The importation and sale of religious material is allowed; however, attempts to spread Christianity among Muslims are not permitted. Non-Muslim religious leaders reported that customs authorities rarely questioned the entry of religious materials such as Bibles and hymnals into the country, expressing religious identity. Conversion from Islam is not permitted. In spite of this, a 2015 study estimated  some 200 believers in Christ from a Muslim background, though not all of those are necessarily citizen of the UAE.

On December 25, 2007, the President's Religious Affairs Advisor Al Sayyed Ali al-Hashemi participated in Anglican Church celebrations of Christmas.

History
In pre-Islamic times, the population of Eastern Arabia consisted of Christianized Arabs (including Abd al-Qays) and Assyrian Christians among other religions. Syriac functioned as a liturgical language. Serjeant states that the Baharna may be the Arabized descendants of converts from the original population of Christians (Aramaeans), among other religions at the time of Arab conquests. Beth Qatraye which translates "region of the Qataris" in Syriac was the Christian name used for the region encompassing north-eastern Arabia. It included Bahrain, Tarout Island, Al-Khatt, Al-Hasa, and Qatar. Oman and the United Arab Emirates comprised the diocese known as Beth Mazunaye. The name was derived from 'Mazun', the Persian name for Oman and the United Arab Emirates. Sohar was the central city of the diocese.  In 2014, 25% of the Dubai residents were Christians.

Denominations

Catholicism

The Catholic Church in the United Arab Emirates is part of the worldwide Catholic Church, under the spiritual leadership of the Pope in Rome.
Expatriates in the country who are Catholics are largely Filipinos, South Asians (Indians, Pakistanis, Bangladeshis and Sri Lankans), South Americans, Lebanese, Africans, Italians, Spanish, Portuguese, French, Germans, Ukrainians and other Europeans. The United Arab Emirates forms part of the Apostolic Vicariate of Southern Arabia and the Vicar Apostolic Bishop Paul Hinder is based in Abu Dhabi.

There are currently 9 Catholic churches in the region:
St. Joseph's Cathedral, Abu Dhabi,
St. Mary's Catholic Church, Dubai,
St. Francis of Assisi Catholic Church, Jebel Ali,
St. Michael's Catholic Church, Sharjah,
St. Mary's Catholic Church, Al Ain,
St. Paul's Catholic Church, Musaffah,
St. Anthony of Padua Church, Ras Al Khaimah,
Our Lady of Perpetual Help Catholic Church, Fujairah,
St. John the Baptist Catholic Church, Ruwais,
Sub Centres in Kalba, Khorfakkan, Dibba and Madinat Zayed.

Eastern Orthodoxy
 
Eastern Orthodox Christians in UAE traditionally belong to the jurisdiction of Eastern Orthodox Patriarchate of Antioch and All the East. Eastern Orthodox parishes in Dubai and Abu Dhabi were organized in 1980 by late Metropolitan Constantine Papastephanou of Baghdad and Kuwait (1969–2014), who also had ecclesiastical jurisdiction over Eastern Orthodox in UAE. Since 1989, parish in Abu Dhabi was administered by priest Stephanos Neaimeh. After the retirement of Metropolitan Constantine in 2014, the Holy Synod of Eastern Orthodox Patriarchate of Antioch decided to establish an Exarchate for Eastern Orthodox in UAE. In the same time, auxiliary Bishop Gregorios Khoury was appointed head of the newly established Exarchate, subjected directly to Patriarch John X of Antioch who personally visited UAE in the spring of 2014 and inaugurated the construction of new Eastern Orthodox Cathedral of Saint Elias in Abu Dhabi.

Protestantism 

Among the Protestant denominations in the country are the Christian Brethren, the Coptic Evangelical Church and the Evangelical Alliance Church. Other denominations are the Arab Evangelical Church of Dubai, Dubai City Church, Fellowship of the Emirates,  and the United Christian Church of Dubai. The Anglican Communion is represented by the Diocese of Cyprus and the Gulf of the Episcopal Church in Jerusalem and the Middle East.

The large number of migrants from the South Indian state of Kerala follow Christianity, predominantly from the Christian belt of Central Kerala. The denominations represented by this community includes the Mar Thoma Syrian Church, Malankara Orthodox Syrian Church, Jacobite Syrian Christian Church, Knanaya, Pentecostalism (including Indian Pentecostal Church of God, Church of God (Cleveland, Tennessee), Assemblies of God USA, among others) and numerous other evangelical and non-denominational independent groups.

Sharjah houses a church district in Al Yarmook Area which includes places of worship for Coptics, Armenians, Keralites, Filipinos, etc. Since 2006 there are also an independent Afrikaans Churches in Dubai, Abu Dhabi and Al Ain. Most of the members ad here from the Afrikaans speaking Reformed and Evangelical Churches in South Africa.

The Seventh-Day Adventist Church has a presence in the United Arab Emirates, including their scouting group Pathfinders.

Evangelical & Pentacostal Churches
Over 100 Evangelical and Pentecostal churches meet every week in the Holy Trinity Church Complex, Oud Metha (near the St.Marys Church). The Dubai City Church is one of several churches meeting here, since 1999.

The Church of Jesus Christ of Latter-day Saints 
The Church of Jesus Christ of Latter-day Saints formally began holding church services in Dubai in 1982. The services grew from a small group of less than ten people to a stake organized by apostle Jeffrey R. Holland in 2013. The stake currently has 6 congregations: 5 wards and 1 branch.

On April 5, 2020, church president Russell M. Nelson announced that the government of the United Arab Emirates had invited the church to construct a temple in Dubai. According to the church, the temple will be constructed in District 2020 after Expo 2020 has concluded.

Art and media 

Christian art is an important part of expressing faith for Christians, as are the many forms of Christian media. Archeological sites containing early Christian art and architecture can be found throughout the region, including at Sir Bani Yas and Siniyah Island.

Christian news outlets such as Christian Broadcasting Network and Trinity Broadcasting Network operate in the region, as do various forms of Christian radio. Contemporary Christian music bands and artists have performed and recorded music videos in the country, and Christian films often see release in Dubai theatres. There are Christian bookstores, which carry Christian literature and media, there is a chain of Bible Society Book Stores which can be found in Abu Dhabi, Dubai, Sharjah, Al Ain, and RAK.

See also
Christianity by country
Catholic Church in the United Arab Emirates
Protestantism in the United Arab Emirates
Religion in the United Arab Emirates
Freedom of religion in the United Arab Emirates
Human rights in the United Arab Emirates

References

Sources

External links
Indian Orthodox Church, Dubai
Dubai City Church
Dubai Evangelical Church Centre
Christ Church Jebel Ali - Anglican Church of Dubai
United Christian Church of Dubai Website
King's Revival Church INT'L Ministries
Church of Jesus Christ of Latter-day saints

 
Religion in the United Arab Emirates